Albano Cathedral (Cattedrale di San Pancrazio) is a Roman Catholic cathedral in the city of Albano Laziale, in the province of Rome and the region of Lazio, Italy. It is the seat of the Suburbicarian Diocese of Albano.

The present cathedral building was consecrated in 1721, but stands on the site of a much older basilica, dedicated to Saint John the Baptist, founded by Constantine the Great. Pope Leo III (d. 816) built a new cathedral on the site and changed the dedication to Saint Pancras, as it now is.

References
Notes

Sources and external links
 Diocese of Albano: official website 
 
 Controluce.it La Cattedrale di Albano 

Roman Catholic cathedrals in Italy
Churches in the metropolitan city of Rome
Cathedrals in Lazio
18th-century Roman Catholic church buildings in Italy
Roman Catholic churches completed in 1721
1721 establishments in the Papal States
1721 establishments in Italy
Minor basilicas in Lazio
Buildings and structures in Albano Laziale